Laura Robinson may refer to:
 Laura Robinson (journalist), Canadian sports journalist and author
 Laura M. Robinson, Canadian actress, author, and game designer
 Laura Robinson (scientist), British professor of geochemistry